Masterpiece (formerly known as Masterpiece Theatre) is a drama anthology television series produced by WGBH Boston. It premiered on Public Broadcasting Service (PBS) on January 10, 1971. The series has presented numerous acclaimed British productions. Many of these are produced by the BBC, but the line-up has also included programs shown on the UK commercial channels ITV and Channel 4.

Overview 
Masterpiece is known for presenting adaptations of novels and biographies, but it also shows original television dramas. The first title to air was The First Churchills, starring Susan Hampshire as Sarah Churchill. Other programs presented on the series include The Six Wives of Henry VIII; Elizabeth R; I, Claudius; Upstairs, Downstairs; The Duchess of Duke Street; The Citadel; The Jewel in the Crown; Reckless; House of Cards; Traffik, and Jeeves and Wooster. More recent popular titles include Prime Suspect, The Forsyte Saga, Sherlock, and Downton Abbey.

The theme music played during the opening credits is the Fanfare-Rondeau from Suite of Symphonies for brass, strings and timpani No. 1 by French composer Jean-Joseph Mouret. The theme was performed by Collegium Musicum de Paris. Roland Douatte was the conductor. It was recorded in 1954 by Vogue Records in Paris, France, and was later remastered in stereo and re-released by Nonesuch Records in the 1960s.

During the first seasons in the 1970s, the theme music accompanied varying closeup shots of a waving British flag, which panned out into a still image of a British flag on a staff serving as the P in "Masterpiece".  In the late 1970s, the opening video switched to views of antique books and other literary artifacts, many of which titles had been dramatized on the program.

In 1980, Masterpiece gained a sister series, Mystery!, featuring a mix of contemporary and classic British detective and crime series, such as The Inspector Lynley Mysteries, Agatha Christie's Miss Marple, and Touching Evil.  In 2000, to commemorate the 30th anniversary of the show, it presented Masterpiece: The American Collection, nine works by American writers, including Thornton Wilder's Our Town, starring Paul Newman.

Awards and nominations 
One of television's most honored series, the various shows aired on Masterpiece have won numerous Emmy and Peabody Awards.

In 2013, TV Guide ranked it #3 in its list of the 60 Greatest Dramas of All Time and #16 in its list of the 60 Greatest Shows of All Time.

History 
The success of the broadcast of the 1967 version of The Forsyte Saga on NET (the precursor of PBS) led Stanford Calderwood, then serving as president of WGBH, to investigate whether the BBC would sell programs to the station. Suggestions for the series format came from, among others, Frank Gillard in the UK and Christopher Sarson in the US. In looking for an underwriter for the series, Calderwood eventually met with Herb Schmertz of Mobil Corporation. Schmertz was able to gain funding for the show, and with Joan Wilson of WGBH-TV bought the US distribution rights for fifty hours of British dramas for about $1 million per year. He and several other men, including Frank Marshall, met in London and made a selection of programs to be broadcast.

Decisions on the format of the show were finalized and the series premiered on January 10, 1971, with the first episode of The First Churchills. The working title for the series had been The Best of the BBC, which was changed to Masterpiece Theatre before the first broadcast, with Sarson insisting upon the British spelling for Theatre. The series was hosted by British-American broadcaster and author / journalist Alistair Cooke (1908–2004), who initially had been reluctant to take the role. Cooke appeared for two decades until 1992; native Baltimorean, Pulitzer Prize-winning author and longtime columnist for The New York Times, Russell Baker (1925–2019), was next and hosted for over a decade from 1992 to 2004. From 2004 to 2008, it was broadcast without a host.

The original series producer was Sarson. He was succeeded in 1973 by Joan Wilson. The current series producer, Rebecca Eaton, took over in 1985 after Wilson's death from cancer.  Mobil pulled out in 2004. In 2011 Eaton launched the Masterpiece Trust as a fundraising initiative, in collaboration with WGBH Boston.  The Trust gives donors the opportunity to support their local PBS station and also "secure the future of superb British drama...invest upfront in the development of new scripts and programs, and grow the [Masterpiece] series both on-air and online". In the same year the series attracted new sponsors Viking River Cruises and Ralph Lauren (Ralph Lauren was subsequently replaced by Farmers Insurance). In the first three years the Trust raised $12 million from 45 donors.

The Masterpiece approach has been reported as being to put up about 10% of the production budget, in return for distribution rights and a degree of consultation on casting and content, but not editorial control. Masterpiece licences programs for several years, after which the broadcast rights revert to the original owners, generally the British producer or distributor. Interviewed in 2017, Eaton described her role at Masterpiece as "the person who chooses which British programs will be included in Masterpiece...looking at a lot of shows that are already made, reading scripts, and choosing the ones that would suit this audience."

Format change 

In 2008, the word "Theatre" was dropped, and the show, officially known as Masterpiece, was split into three different sections. Masterpiece Classic was initially hosted by Gillian Anderson; the following year, Laura Linney took her place. Masterpiece Mystery! is hosted by Alan Cumming. Masterpiece Contemporary was hosted initially by Matthew Goode, who was replaced by David Tennant in 2009.

All three versions received their own opening sequences and theme music with a common signature based upon the First Suite in D by Mouret (originally chosen by Sarson, who had heard it played at a Club Med resort in Sicily, because it sounded "British and heraldic"). In the opening to the "Classic" strand of shows, the word "Theatre" appears for a brief moment, apparently in order to maintain WGBH's trademark registration on the former name (in 2011, the show's 40th anniversary, the opening was altered to show "Classic" briefly before showing "40 years"). The theme music was composed by Man Made Music, Inc; the opening sequences were designed by Kyle Cooper of Prologue.

As of 2017's broadcast of Victoria series one, Masterpiece Classic no longer aired with a regular host and the series was no longer branded as "Masterpiece Classic" but simply "Masterpiece".

The Best of Masterpiece Theatre 
In March 2007, to celebrate the 35th anniversary of the show, PBS aired an entertainment special produced and directed by Darcy Corcoran. The Best of Masterpiece was hosted by Derek Jacobi and featured interviews with Helen Mirren, Hugh Laurie, Damian Lewis, Robson Green, Ian Richardson, Gillian Anderson, Charles Dance, Alex Kingston, Anthony Andrews and Jean Marsh. The countdown special was based on more than 20,000 survey responses posted to the Masterpiece and PBS affiliate websites, the top 12 series were:
 Upstairs, Downstairs
 The Forsyte Saga (2002 adaptation)
 I, Claudius
 Bleak House (2005 adaptation)
 Prime Suspect parts 4–7
 The Jewel in the Crown
 Poldark (1970s version)
 House of Cards
 Reckless
 The Fortunes and Misfortunes of Moll Flanders
 Wives & Daughters (1999 adaptation)
 Jeeves and Wooster

At the end of the program, Anthony Andrews thanked the audience for voting the 1981 serial Brideshead Revisited as the seventh favorite series. He then pointed out that it had not aired as a part of Masterpiece Theatre. Rather, it had aired as a part of the PBS series entitled Great Performances.

Parodies 
 A series of film, theatre, and television show parodies appeared on Sesame Street as "Monsterpiece Theater", hosted by Cookie Monster as "Alistair Cookie". The theme music for "Monsterpiece Theater" (composed by Sam Pottle) was similar to the theme composed by Mouret.
 Disney Channel had a show titled Mousterpiece Theater hosted by George Plimpton, featuring Disney animated shorts.
 On In Living Color during Season 5 a sketch titled "Parody of Masterpiece" aired in which Jamie Foxx and David Alan Grier recited the lyrics of popular gangster rap songs of the early 1990s by artist such as Dr. Dre and Ice Cube.  Cast member Marc Wilmore was the host imitating James Earl Jones.
 Fox's long running sketch comedy show Mad TV did a parody called "Master P's Theater", featuring a parody of the New Orleans rapper of the same name.
 In 2008, Boing Boing Video featured a web series called SPAMasterpiece Theater where humorist John Hodgman read unsolicited email spam in dramatizations in the parody of Masterpiece.

See also 
 List of Masterpiece Theatre episodes
 List of Masterpiece Classic episodes
 List of Masterpiece Mystery! episodes
 List of Masterpiece Contemporary episodes
 Mobil Showcase Network

References

Further reading 
 Masterpiece: A Celebration of 25 Years of Outstanding Television by Terrence O'Flaherty (1996), 
 Masterpiece and the Politics of Quality by Laurence Jarvik (1999) 
 Making Masterpiece:  25 years behind the scenes at Masterpiece Theatre and Mystery! on PBS by Rebecca Eaton (2013)

External links 
  on PBS
 Masterpiece Shows on PBS
 Masterpiece Studios Podcast on Apple Podcasts
 
 
 

 
1970s American anthology television series
1970s American drama television series
1971 American television series debuts
1980s American anthology television series
1980s American drama television series
1990s American anthology television series
1990s American drama television series
2000s American anthology television series
2000s American drama television series
2010s American anthology television series
2010s American drama television series
2020s American anthology television series
English-language television shows
PBS original programming
Peabody Award-winning television programs
Television series by WGBH
Television series by WNET